Tal-y-llyn, or Talyllyn, is a small hamlet and former parish in Gwynedd, Wales, situated at the end of Tal-y-llyn Lake close to the village of Abergynolwyn. The River Dysynni flows out of the lake at this point, flowing down to enter Cardigan Bay north of Tywyn. Another lake known as Llyn y Tri Greyenyn or Llyn Bach was formerly located close to the border with the parish of Dolgellau. 

For much of the 19th century, and the first half of the 20th century, the predominant industry in the area was slate mining, in the quarries at Bryn Eglwys and Corris. The Talyllyn Railway was built in the 1860s to serve the quarries at Bryn Eglwys. Although this never reached the lake, and was never planned to do so, the terminus of the railway was in the parish, thereby giving the railway its name. Tourism is now one of the principle industries in the area, and the hamlet includes a hotel and public house.

The parish church, St Mary's, dates from the 13th century, with the present structure dating from around 1590. It is a Grade II* listed building. John David Edwards, a cleric and hymn tune composer, is buried in the churchyard.

References

Villages in Gwynedd
Villages in Snowdonia
Llanfihangel-y-Pennant